Bill or Billy Harris may refer to:

Music
 Bill Harris (musician) (1916–1973), American jazz trombonist
 Bill Harris (guitarist) (1925–1988), American guitarist with the vocal group The Clovers

Politics
 Bill Harris (Ohio politician) (1934–2017), American state senator
 Bill Harris (Montana politician), member of the Montana State House of Representatives
 Bill Harris (lobbyist), American lobbyist

Sports 
 Bill Harris (1930s pitcher) (1900–1965), American baseball pitcher for the Reds, Pirates, and Red Sox
 Bill Harris (1950s pitcher) (1931–2011), Canadian baseball pitcher for the Dodgers
 Bill Harris (Australian footballer) (1877–1957), Australian footballer (Australian rules)
 Bill Harris (New Zealand footballer), New Zealand footballer
 Bill Harris (swimmer) (1897–1961), American swimmer
 Bill Harris (Welsh footballer) (1928–1989), Welsh international footballer and manager

 Billy Harris (American football), American football player
 Billy Harris (baseball) (1943–2020), American baseball infielder
 Billy Harris (basketball) (1951–2010), American basketball player
 Billy Harris (ice hockey, born 1935) (1935–2001), Canadian ice hockey player for the Toronto Maple Leafs
 Billy Harris (ice hockey, born 1952), Canadian ice hockey player for the New York Islanders
 Billy Harris (rugby league) (born 1951), rugby league footballer for Wakefield Trinity and Oldham
 Billy Harris (rugby league, born 1992), rugby league footballer for Stanley Rangers, Castleford Tigers, and Dewsbury Rams
 Billy Harris (tennis) (born 1995), British tennis player

Others 
 Bill Harris (aviator) (1916–2012), United States Army Air Force fighter ace
 Bill Harris (geneticist) (1944–2014), Scottish geneticist
 Bill Harris (neuroscientist) (born 1950), Canadian neuroscientist
 Bill Harris (television producer), American television executive

See also
William Harris (disambiguation)